Stefan Andrus Burr (born 1940) is a mathematician and computer scientist.  He is a retired professor of Computer Science at The City College of New York.

Burr received his Ph.D. in 1969 from Princeton University under the supervision of Bernard Dwork; his thesis research involved the Waring–Goldbach problem in number theory, which concerns the representations of integers as sums of powers of prime numbers.

Many of his subsequent publications involve problems from the field of Ramsey theory.  He has published 27 papers with Paul Erdős. The Burr–Erdős conjecture, published as a conjecture by Burr and Erdős in 1975, solved only in 2015, states that sparse graphs have linearly growing Ramsey numbers.

Selected publications

with P. Erdõs and J. H. Spencer: 
with P. Erdõs, R. J. Faudree, C. C. Rousseau and R. H. Schelp:

References 

Living people
20th-century American mathematicians
21st-century American mathematicians
Combinatorialists
Princeton University faculty
City College of New York faculty
1940 births
Princeton University alumni